Sir Andrew Reed  (26 September 1837 – 7 November 1914) was an Anglo-Irish barrister and inspector-general of the Royal Irish Constabulary.

Reed was born in Galway, Ireland, the son of John Reed of Galway and Mary Adamson of County Meath. He was educated at Queen's University Belfast and called to the Bar in 1873. He entered the Royal Irish Constabulary and was appointed District Inspector, 1859; became Inspector-General in 1885. He retired 1900.

Aside from being the only R.I.C. cadet officer to be promoted Inspector General, Reed changed the rules for promotion in the Royal Irish Constabulary. Up until his tenure, Catholics had little success in attaining promotions.  Even though most of the force was Catholic, almost all the officers were non-Catholic.  Reed instituted a rule that each year, 60 men who were Catholic and passed the Sergeant's exam would be promoted.

He was appointed a Knight Bachelor in 1889, a Companion of the Order of the Bath (CB) in 1892, a Commander of the Royal Victorian Order (CVO) in 1900 and a Knight Commander of the Order of the Bath (KCB) in 1897.

His son Major General Hamilton Lyster Reed was awarded the Victoria Cross for his bravery in the Second Boer War.

Reed died in Dublin in November 1914 and is buried in Deans Grange Cemetery. His epitaph reads: - "I have no greater joy than to hear that my children walk in truth." (3 John 4.)

References

1837 births
1914 deaths
Irish barristers
Inspectors-General of the Royal Irish Constabulary
Knights Commander of the Order of the Bath
Commanders of the Royal Victorian Order
Burials at Deans Grange Cemetery
Alumni of Queen's University Belfast
People from Galway (city)